The Lotka–Volterra equations, also known as the predator–prey equations, are a pair of first-order nonlinear differential equations, frequently used to describe the dynamics of biological systems in which two species interact, one as a predator and the other as prey. The populations change through time according to the pair of equations:

where
 is the number of prey (for example, rabbits);
 is the number of some predator (for example, foxes);
 and  represent the instantaneous growth rates of the two populations;
 represents time;

The Lotka–Volterra system of equations is an example of a Kolmogorov model, which is a more general framework that can model the dynamics of ecological systems with predator–prey interactions, competition, disease, and mutualism.

History

The Lotka–Volterra predator–prey model was initially proposed by Alfred J. Lotka in the theory of autocatalytic chemical reactions in 1910. This was effectively the logistic equation, originally derived by Pierre François Verhulst. In 1920 Lotka extended the model, via Andrey Kolmogorov, to "organic systems" using a plant species and a herbivorous animal species as an example and in 1925 he used the equations to analyse predator–prey interactions in his book on biomathematics. The same set of equations was published in 1926 by Vito Volterra, a mathematician and physicist, who had become interested in mathematical biology. Volterra's enquiry was inspired through his interactions with the marine biologist Umberto D'Ancona, who was courting his daughter at the time and later was to become his son-in-law. D'Ancona studied the fish catches in the Adriatic Sea and had noticed that the percentage of predatory fish caught had increased during the years of World War I (1914–18). This puzzled him, as the fishing effort had been very much reduced during the war years. Volterra developed his model independently from Lotka and used it to explain d'Ancona's observation.

The model was later extended to include density-dependent prey growth and a functional response of the form developed by C. S. Holling; a model that has become known as the Rosenzweig–MacArthur model. Both the Lotka–Volterra and Rosenzweig–MacArthur models have been used to explain the dynamics of natural populations of predators and prey, such as the lynx and snowshoe hare data of the Hudson's Bay Company and the moose and wolf populations in Isle Royale National Park.

In the late 1980s, an alternative to the Lotka–Volterra predator–prey model (and its common-prey-dependent generalizations) emerged, the ratio dependent or Arditi–Ginzburg model. The validity of prey- or ratio-dependent models has been much debated.

The Lotka–Volterra equations have a long history of use in economic theory; their initial application is commonly credited to Richard Goodwin in 1965 or 1967.

Physical meaning of the equations

The Lotka–Volterra model makes a number of assumptions, not necessarily realizable in nature, about the environment and evolution of the predator and prey populations:
The prey population finds ample food at all times.
The food supply of the predator population depends entirely on the size of the prey population.
The rate of change of population is proportional to its size.
During the process, the environment does not change in favour of one species, and genetic adaptation is inconsequential.
Predators have limitless appetite.

In this case the solution of the differential equations is deterministic and continuous. This, in turn, implies that the generations of both the predator and prey are continually overlapping.

Prey
When multiplied out, the prey equation becomes

The prey are assumed to have an unlimited food supply and to reproduce exponentially, unless subject to predation; this exponential growth is represented in the equation above by the term .

With these two terms the equation above can be interpreted as follows: the rate of change of the prey's population is given by its own growth rate minus the rate at which it is preyed upon.

Predators
The predator equation becomes 

In this equation,  represents the growth of the predator population. (Note the similarity to the predation rate; however, a different constant is used, as the rate at which the predator population grows is not necessarily equal to the rate at which it consumes the prey). The term  represents the loss rate of the predators due to either natural death or emigration, it leads to an exponential decay in the absence of prey.

Hence the equation expresses that the rate of change of the predator's population depends upon the rate at which it consumes prey, minus its intrinsic death rate.

Solutions to the equations
The equations have periodic solutions.  These solutions do not have a simple expression in terms of the usual trigonometric functions, although they are quite tractable.

It is the only parameter affecting the nature of the solutions.

A linearization of the equations yields a solution similar to simple harmonic motion with the population of predators trailing that of prey by 90° in the cycle.

A simple example

Suppose there are two species of animals, a baboon (prey) and a cheetah (predator). If the initial conditions are 10 baboons and 10 cheetahs, one can plot the progression of the two species over time; given the parameters that the growth and death rates of baboon are 1.1 and 0.4 while that of cheetahs are 0.1 and 0.4 respectively. The choice of time interval is arbitrary.

One may also plot solutions parametrically as orbits in phase space, without representing time, but with one axis representing the number of prey and the other axis representing the number of predators for all times.

This corresponds to eliminating time from the two differential equations above to produce a single differential equation

relating the variables x and y. The solutions of this equation are closed curves. It is amenable to separation of variables: integrating
 
yields the implicit relationship 
 
where V is a constant quantity depending on the initial conditions and conserved on each curve.

An aside: These graphs illustrate a serious potential problem with this as a biological model: For this specific choice of parameters, in each cycle, the baboon population is reduced to extremely low numbers, yet recovers (while the cheetah population remains sizeable at the lowest baboon density). In real-life situations, however, chance fluctuations of the discrete numbers of individuals, as well as the family structure and life-cycle of baboons, might cause the baboons to actually go extinct, and, by consequence, the cheetahs as well. This modelling problem has been called the "atto-fox problem", an atto-fox being a notional 10−18 of a fox.

Hamiltonian structure of the system
Since the quantity  is conserved over time, it plays role of a Hamiltonian function of the system. To see this we can define Poisson bracket as follows	
.  Then Hamilton's equations read

However, using transformations  and  we came up to a canonical form of the Hamilton's equations featuring the Hamiltonian :

Phase-space plot of a further example
A less extreme example covers: 
Assume ,  quantify thousands each. Circles represent prey and predator initial conditions from  =  = 0.9 to 1.8, in steps of 0.1. The fixed point is at (1, 1/2).

Dynamics of the system
In the model system, the predators thrive when there are plentiful prey but, ultimately, outstrip their food supply and decline. As the predator population is low, the prey population will increase again. These dynamics continue in a population cycle of growth and decline.

Population equilibrium
Population equilibrium occurs in the model when neither of the population levels is changing, i.e. when both of the derivatives are equal to 0:

The above system of equations yields two solutions:

and

Hence, there are two equilibria.

The first solution effectively represents the extinction of both species. If both populations are at 0, then they will continue to be so indefinitely. The second solution represents a fixed point at which both populations sustain their current, non-zero numbers, and, in the simplified model, do so indefinitely. The levels of population at which this equilibrium is achieved depend on the chosen values of the parameters α, β, γ, and δ.

Stability of the fixed points
The stability of the fixed point at the origin can be determined by performing a linearization using partial derivatives.

The Jacobian matrix of the predator–prey model is

and is known as the community matrix.

First fixed point (extinction)

The eigenvalues of this matrix are

Hence the fixed point at the origin is a saddle point.

The instability of this fixed point is of significance. If it were stable, non-zero populations might be attracted towards it, and as such the dynamics of the system might lead towards the extinction of both species for many cases of initial population levels. However, as the fixed point at the origin is a saddle point, and hence unstable, it follows that the extinction of both species is difficult in the model. (In fact, this could only occur if the prey were artificially completely eradicated, causing the predators to die of starvation. If the predators were eradicated, the prey population would grow without bound in this simple model.) The populations of prey and predator can get infinitesimally close to zero and still recover.

Second fixed point (oscillations)
Evaluating J at the second fixed point leads to

The eigenvalues of this matrix are

As the eigenvalues are both purely imaginary and conjugate to each other, this fixed point must either be a center for closed orbits in the local vicinity or an attractive or repulsive spiral. In conservative systems, there must be closed orbits in the local vicinity of fixed points that exist at the minima and maxima of the conserved quantity. The conserved quantity is derived above to be  on orbits. Thus orbits about the fixed point are closed and elliptic, so the solutions are periodic, oscillating on a small ellipse around the fixed point, with a frequency  and period .

As illustrated in the circulating oscillations in the figure above, the level curves are closed orbits surrounding the fixed point: the levels of the predator and prey populations cycle and oscillate without damping around the fixed point with frequency .

The value of the constant of motion , or, equivalently, can be found for the closed orbits near the fixed point.

Increasing  moves a closed orbit  closer to the fixed point. The largest value of the constant  is obtained by solving the optimization problem

The maximal value of K is thus attained at the stationary (fixed) point  and amounts to 

where  is Euler's number.

See also

Competitive Lotka–Volterra equations
Generalized Lotka–Volterra equation
Mutualism and the Lotka–Volterra equation
Community matrix
Population dynamics
Population dynamics of fisheries
Nicholson–Bailey model
Reaction–diffusion system
Paradox of enrichment
Lanchester's laws, a similar system of differential equations for military forces

Notes

Further reading

 – a modern discussion using Hudson's Bay Company data on lynx and hares in Canada from 1847 to 1903.

External links

From the Wolfram Demonstrations Project — requires CDF player (free):
Predator–Prey Equations
Predator–Prey Model
Predator–Prey Dynamics with Type-Two Functional Response
Predator–Prey Ecosystem: A Real-Time Agent-Based Simulation
 Lotka-Volterra Algorithmic Simulation (Web simulation).

Predation
Ordinary differential equations
Fixed points (mathematics)
Population models
Mathematical modeling
Community ecology
Population ecology